Jakes Bejoy (born 27 May 1984) is an Indian film score composer, music producer, and singer. He predominantly works in Malayalam cinema, but has also worked in Tamil, Telugu and Hindi languages. 
He started his film musical career as a singer, in the 2012 film Second Show, directed by Srinath Rajendran, starring Dulquer Salmaan in the lead role. Angels (2014) was his debut film as a music director.

Education
Jakes Bejoy is trained in Carnatic music, and was introduced to gospel and western music during his time at Montfort School, Yercaud. He has an engineering degree from Rajagiri School of Engineering & Technology (Autonomous), and a master's degree in Music Science and Technology from Stanford University, USA.

Career
After graduating in 2010, he was a music intern at Activision Blizzard and Namco Bandai, working on the Guitar Hero series, Splatterhouse, and Pacman. He also worked with the audio team at The Walt Disney Company on video games including Cars, Brave, and Toy Story 3.

In 2007, he released the album Malayalee, subsequently moving back to India. He went on to compose music for short films and advertisement jingles. He has written the music score for movies such as Dhuruvangal Pathinaaru, Ranam, Queen, Swathanthryam Ardharathriyil and Monsoon Mangoes. Taxiwala starring Vijay Devarakonda was his debut in Telugu.

Discography

References

External links
 

Malayalam film score composers
Film musicians from Kerala
Living people
Tamil film score composers
People from Kottayam district
21st-century Indian composers
Telugu film score composers
1984 births